VA251 may refer to:
 Ariane flight VA251, an Ariane 5 launch that occurred on 16 January 2020
 Virgin Australia flight 251, with IATA flight number VA251
 Virginia State Route 251 (SR 251 or VA-251), a primary state highway in the United States